Sami Daher is a Lebanese actor and voice actor.

Filmography

Film

Television

Plays 
Waylon Le Omma. 2013

Dubbing roles 

 Batman: The Animated Series - Harvey Bullock, Penguin, Kyodai Ken (Lebanese dubbing version)
 Ben 10: Omniverse - Argit (second voice)
 Bolt (uncredited; Classical Arabic version)
 Courage the Cowardly Dog
 Mokhtarnameh
 Prophet Joseph

References

External links

Lebanese male actors
Lebanese male voice actors
Year of birth missing (living people)
Living people